Fred Lüthi (born 7 March 1930) is a Swiss middle-distance runner. He competed in the men's 800 metres at the 1952 Summer Olympics.

References

External links
 

1930 births
Living people
Athletes (track and field) at the 1952 Summer Olympics
Swiss male middle-distance runners
Olympic athletes of Switzerland
Place of birth missing (living people)